The 1991 Torneo Godó was the 39th edition of the Torneo Godó annual men's tennis tournament played on clay courts in outdoor Barcelona, Catalonia, Spain and part of the Championship Series of the 1991 ATP Tour. It was the 39th edition of the tournament took place from 8 April through 14 April 1991. Seventh-seeded Emilio Sánchez won the singles title.

Finals

Singles

 Emilio Sánchez defeated  Sergi Bruguera 6–4, 7–6(9–7), 6–2

Doubles

 Horacio de la Peña /  Diego Nargiso defeated  Boris Becker /  Eric Jelen 3–6, 7–6, 6–4

References

External links
 Official tournament website
 ATP tournament profile

Torneo Godo
Barcelona Open (tennis)
Torneo Godó
Torneo Godó